T-Bird Gang is a 1959 American film directed by Richard Harbinger in his first and final film. It was co-written by and starring John Brinkley and Tony Miller with Edwin Nelson; all of them had appeared in several of Roger Corman's films.

Plot
A group of criminals rob a warehouse where they cosh the elderly night watchman. The watchman's ex-G.I. son Frank finds his barely conscious father who soon dies from the injury; his last words being that the group drove a white T-Bird. Frank tracks the gang down with the idea of vengeance, but the police apprehend him and force him into getting his revenge by infiltrating the gang of robbin' hoods.

Production
Shot in 1958 under the title of Cry Out in Vengeance, it was released by executive producer Roger Corman as a double feature with High School Big Shot as the first release of his Filmgroup company.

Corman financed the film.

In February 1959 Filmgroup announced they would release ten films. Their first movies were High School Big Shot (1959) and T-Bird Gang (1959) produced by Stanley Bickman.

Cast 
John Brinkley as Frank Simmons, alias Frank Minor
Edwin Nelson as Alex Hendricks
Tony Miller as Raymond Gunderson
Patricia George as Marla Stanosky, alias Marla Stanley
Coleman Francis as Capt. R. M. Prell
Nola Thorp as Kay
Beach Dickerson as Barney Adams
Trent Dollar as Boy
Gene Walker
Steve Harris
Robert Wendell
Henry Randolph
Vic Tayback as a policeman
Glenn Campbell
Earl Miles

Notes

External links 

1959 films
1959 drama films
American black-and-white films
American crime drama films
1950s English-language films
1950s American films